The Anchorage is a mixed commercial and residential building at 1555 Connecticut Avenue NW in  Washington, D.C. Built in 1924 to a design by local architect Jules Henri de Sibour, the building is a contributing property to the Dupont Circle Historic District.

Notable past tenants include Tallulah Bankhead, Ernest Cuneo, Arthur Goldberg, Charles Lindbergh, Robert F. Kennedy, and Sam Rayburn.

Notes

External links
Dupont Circle Historic District

Dupont Circle
Historic district contributing properties in Washington, D.C.
Office buildings completed in 1924
Residential buildings completed in 1924
Residential buildings in Washington, D.C.